Premier League is the premier professional futsal league in Belarus.  It was founded in 1990. Organized by Football Federation of Belarus and is played under UEFA rules, consists of 16 teams.

List of champions

Teams 2017-18
Achova-Dynama (Minsk)
AK Paŭdniovy (Homieĺ Region)
Amatar (Brest)
Barysaŭ-900 (Barysaŭ)
BČ (Homieĺ)
Darozhnik (Minsk)
Dynama-BNTU (Minsk)
Forte (Mahilioŭ)
Hranit (Mikaševičy)
Lidsieľmash (Lida)
Stalitsa (Minsk)
Śvietlahorsk (Śvietlahorsk)
Ščučyn (Ščučyn)
UUS-Dynama (Hrodna)
Viten (Orša)
VRZ (Homieĺ)

External links
Official website
Futsalplanet 

Futsal competitions in Belarus
Belarus
Futsal
1990 establishments in Belarus
Sports leagues established in 1990
Futsal
Professional sports leagues in Belarus